The Canton of Bapaume is a canton situated in the department of the Pas-de-Calais and in the Hauts-de-France region of northern France.

Geography  
The canton is organized around Bapaume in the arrondissement of Arras.

Composition
At the French canton reorganisation which came into effect in March 2015, the canton was expanded from 22 to 75 communes:

Ablainzevelle
Achiet-le-Grand
Achiet-le-Petit
Avesnes-lès-Bapaume
Ayette
Bancourt
Bapaume
Baralle
Barastre
Beaulencourt
Beaumetz-lès-Cambrai
Béhagnies
Bertincourt
Beugnâtre
Beugny
Biefvillers-lès-Bapaume
Bihucourt
Bourlon
Bucquoy
Buissy
Bullecourt
Bus
Chérisy
Courcelles-le-Comte
Croisilles
Douchy-lès-Ayette
Écourt-Saint-Quentin
Écoust-Saint-Mein
Épinoy
Ervillers
Favreuil
Fontaine-lès-Croisilles
Frémicourt
Gomiécourt
Graincourt-lès-Havrincourt
Grévillers
Hamelincourt
Haplincourt
Havrincourt
Hermies
Inchy-en-Artois
Lagnicourt-Marcel
Lebucquière
Léchelle
Ligny-Thilloy
Marquion
Martinpuich
Metz-en-Couture
Morchies
Morval
Mory
Moyenneville
Neuville-Bourjonval
Noreuil
Oisy-le-Verger
Palluel
Pronville-en-Artois
Quéant
Riencourt-lès-Bapaume
Rocquigny
Rumaucourt
Ruyaulcourt
Sains-lès-Marquion
Saint-Léger
Sapignies
Le Sars
Sauchy-Cauchy
Sauchy-Lestrée
Le Transloy
Trescault
Vaulx-Vraucourt
Vélu
Villers-au-Flos
Warlencourt-Eaucourt 
Ytres

Population

See also
Cantons of Pas-de-Calais 
Communes of Pas-de-Calais 
Arrondissements of the Pas-de-Calais department

References

Bapaume